MGTV may refer to:
Mango TV
Michigan Government Television, a defunct television channel in Michigan
MGTV, a Globo local news program in Minas Gerais; see Praça TV